The 1991 Southend-on-Sea Council election took place on 2 May 1991 to elect members of Southend-on-Sea Borough Council in Essex, England. One third of the council was up for election.

Results summary

Ward results

Belfairs

Blenheim

Chalkwell

Eastwood

Leigh

Milton

Prittlewell

Shoebury

Southchurch

St. Luke's

Thorpe

Victoria

Westborough

References

1991
1991 English local elections
1990s in Essex